Norman Beck was an English professional footballer who played as a right half.

Career
Beck played for Tanfield Lea Institute, Bradford City and Barnsley. For Bradford City, he made 3 appearances in the Football League.

Sources

References

Year of birth missing
Year of death missing
English footballers
Bradford City A.F.C. players
Barnsley F.C. players
English Football League players
Association football wing halves